Two-Gun of the Tumbleweed is a 1927 American silent Western film directed by and starring Leo D. Maloney and distributed by Pathé Exchange.

The film is listed as lost on a couple of credible websites; however, it survives and is on an omnibus DVD with some William S. Hart titles.

Cast
 Leo D. Maloney - Two-Gun Calder
 Peggy Montgomery - Doris Gibson (uncredited)
 Josephine Hill - Nan Brunelle (uncredited)
 Frederick Dana - Brunelle (uncredited)
 Lew Meehan - Chuck Lang(uncredited)
 Joe Rickson - Darrel (uncredited)
 Whitehorse  - Miles (uncredited)
 Bud Osborne -
 Robert Burns - The Sheriff(uncredited)
 Tom Smith -
 Slim Cole -

References

External links
 
 
 lobby poster

1927 films
Films directed by Leo D. Maloney
1927 Western (genre) films
American black-and-white films
Pathé Exchange films
Silent American Western (genre) films
1920s American films
1920s English-language films